The 1963 VPI Gobblers football team represented the Virginia Polytechnic Institute in the 1963 NCAA University Division football season.

Schedule

Players
The following players were members of the 1963 football team according to the roster published in the 1964 edition of The Bugle, the Virginia Tech yearbook.

References

VPI
Virginia Tech Hokies football seasons
Southern Conference football champion seasons
VPI Gobblers football